Football competitions at the 2003 Pan American Games in Santo Domingo, Dominican Republic were held between August 2 and 15, 2003. 

Matches were held at three stadiums: Estadio Mirador Este, Estadio San Cristobal, and Estadio Olímpico Juan Pablo Duarte.

Medal summary

Medal table

Medalists

References

 
Soccer
Football
International association football competitions hosted by the Dominican Republic